Mehrubon Jormahmadovič Karimov (born 19 January 2004) is a Tajikistani professional footballer who plays as a defender for Samgurali Tsqaltubo and the Tajikistan national team.

Club career
On 18 July 2022, Dinamo-Auto Tiraspol announced their new signings for the season, which included Karimov. On 2 January 2023, Dinamo-Auto Tiraspol announced that Karimov had left the club after his contract was terminated by mutual consent.

International career
In March 2022, Karimov was called up to the Tajikistan national team for the first time, whilst a player for Dynamo Dushanbe, making his debut in the 92nd minute as a substitute for Alisher Dzhalilov in a 1–0 victory over Kyrgyzstan on 29 March 2022.

In May 2022, Karimov was called up to the Tajikistan training camp to be held in Dubai between 19 May and 3 June 2022.

Career statistics

Club

International

Honors
Tajikistan
King's Cup: 2022

References

External links
 

2004 births
Living people
Tajikistani footballers
Association football defenders
Dynamo Dushanbe players
FC Dinamo-Auto Tiraspol players
Tajikistan Higher League players
Moldovan Super Liga players
Tajikistani expatriate footballers
Tajikistani expatriate sportspeople in Moldova
Expatriate footballers in Moldova
Tajikistan youth international footballers
Tajikistan international footballers